The 1904–05 Bradford City A.F.C. season was the second in the club's history.

Reserve manager Peter O'Rourke took over for the last few games of the season, leading them to 5 wins and a draw in the last six games of the season, and helping them to avoid possible re-election. He became permanent manager shortly afterwards. The club finished 8th in Division Two, and reached the 1st round of the FA Cup.

Sources

References

Bradford City A.F.C. seasons
Bradford City